Islamic Law and International Law: Peaceful Settlement of Disputes is a 2020 book by the American political scientist Emilia Justyna Powell, in which the author examines the presence of Islamic law-related arguments in the jurisprudence of the International Court of Justice.

Reception
The book has been reviewed in International Community Law Review, Journal of Peace Research, International Studies Review, Review of Economics and Political Science and Southeast European and Black Sea Studies.

References

2020 non-fiction books
English non-fiction books
English-language books
International law literature
Sharia
Oxford University Press books
International Court of Justice